Gilmer Frank Isbell (born April 13, 1958) is an American politician. He is a Republican representing District 28 in the Alabama House of Representatives.

Political career 

In 2018, former 28th district representative Craig Ford decided to run for a seat in the Alabama State Senate, leaving his House seat open. Isbell ran for the seat, and defeated Democrat Kyle Pierce to win.

For the 2019–2020 term, Isbell was assigned to the following House committees:
 Commerce and Small Business
 Economic Development and Tourism
 Transportation, Utilities and Infrastructure

References 

Living people
Republican Party members of the Alabama House of Representatives
1958 births
21st-century American politicians